The Genain quadruplets (born in 1930) are a set of identical quadruplet sisters.  All four developed schizophrenia, suggesting a large genetic component to the cause of the disease. The pseudonym Genain, used to protect the identity of the family, comes from the Greek, meaning dire (αἶνος) birth (γεν-). The sisters were given the pseudonyms Nora, Iris, Myra and Hester, to represent each of the four letters in NIMH, the acronym for the United States National Institute of Mental Health.  Nora, Iris, and Hester were hospitalized for their schizophrenia at least once each. As of 2011, Iris and Hester had died.

Personal lives
The sisters were born in a midwestern American town (nicknamed "Envira") on April 14, 1930. They were considered local celebrities due to the quadruple nature of their birth. The four sisters grew up with their parents in the same household. The Genain sisters' parents were described as "disturbed". Their paternal grandmother may have had paranoid schizophrenia, and their father was described as abusive. Myra and Nora were probably treated more favorably by their parents, while Iris and Hester were treated more harshly. The parents considered Hester to be a "habitual masturbator" and referred to her as a "moron type" or "sex maniac". Iris and Hester were both circumcised as children in order to prevent them from masturbation. The quadruplets were reportedly physically abused by their father, pseudonymed as Mr. Genain. Subsequently, the Genains accepted an offer by the NIMH to take the daughters into their clinic and each was diagnosed with schizophrenia.

All of the sisters except Hester graduated from high school. Myra worked as a secretary for most of her life. She married and had two sons. When she grew older, she frequently visited her sisters Nora and Hester. Her eldest son contracted AIDS after a blood transfusion and died in 1996, while her younger son became a maintenance worker and retained a close relationship with his mother. Nora later managed the income the sisters received for having their photograph published in textbooks. Iris worked as a beautician for a while but most of her adult life was spent institutionalized.

Illness and scientific research
All four of the sisters developed schizophrenia by the age of 24. There was a history of mental illness in Mr. Genain's family that might have been an example of genetics being linked with mental illness or it may have just been a dysfunctional and abusive family free from a specific genetic component. Mr. Genain's mother had had a three-year nervous breakdown in her late teens.

References

Further reading

 

1930 births
Living people
Sibling quartets
People with schizophrenia
American people with disabilities
Quadruplets